Mamá campanita is a Mexican telenovela produced by Valentín Pimstein for Televisa in 1978.

Is an adaptation of the telenovela La duquesa produced in 1966.

Cast 
Silvia Derbez as Carmen "Mamá campanita"
Enrique Lizalde as Gerardo
Anita Blanch as Doña Ana
Marilú Elizaga as Doña Irene
Claudio Obregón as Pablo
Graciela Bernardos as Elisa
María Idalia as Beatriz
Silvia Caos as Josefina
Otto Sirgo as Enrique
Laura Zapata as Irene
Raymundo Capetillo as Gabriel
Estela Chacón as Cecilia
Dina de Marco as Lucero
José Elías Moreno as Polo
Maricruz Nájera
Carmen Cortés
Raul Boxer
Julieta Egurrola
Luis Couturier

References

External links 

Mexican telenovelas
1978 telenovelas
Televisa telenovelas
Spanish-language telenovelas
1978 Mexican television series debuts
1978 Mexican television series endings